Statistics Faroe Islands is the national statistical authority of the Faroe Islands. It is an independent authority supervised by the Ministry of Finance. It was established, following a parliamentary act voted by the Løgting on 7 May 1991.

As of 2020, it employs 19 people and it is located in Argir. Statistics Faroe Islands cooperates with the statistical authorities of Nordic countries to create joint publications.

See also

List of national and international statistical services

References

External links
Statistics Faroe Islands official website.

Government agencies of the Faroe Islands
Faroe Islands